Thirst is a 1961 Romanian drama film directed by Mircea Drăgan and Mihai Iacob. It was entered into the 2nd Moscow International Film Festival where it won the Silver Prize.

Cast

 Mircea Balaban
 Ion Besoiu
 Flavia Buref	
 George Calboreanu
 Jules Cazaban
 Ilarion Ciobanu
 Stefan Ciubotarasu
 Benedict Dabija
 Toma Dimitriu
 Dumitru Furdui
 Gheorghe Maruta
 Mihai Mereuta
 Amza Pellea
 Alexandru Virgil Platon
 Eugenia Popovici
 Colea Rautu
 Paul Sava
 Sandu Sticlaru
 Vasile Tomazian
 Lazar Vrabie

References

External links
 

1961 films
1961 drama films
1960s Romanian-language films
Romanian black-and-white films
Films directed by Mircea Drăgan
Films directed by Mihai Iacob
Romanian drama films